Linosa (Nammūša) is one of the Pelagie Islands in the Sicily Channel of the Mediterranean Sea.

The island is a part of the Italian comune of Lampedusa e Linosa, part of the province of Agrigento in Sicily, Italy. It has a population of 430.

Name
The island is cited first as Greek Aethusa (Αἰθοῦσσα) by ancient geographer Strabo, and as Algusa (Ἀλγοῦσσα) by Roman essayist Pliny the Elder in his Naturalis Historia. The name "Lenusa" appeared first during the 16th century in the writing of Tommaso Fazello, while the modern one dates back to 1845.

Geography

History

During the Punic Wars it was used by the Romans as a base; the 150 water cisterns remaining are from this period. Roman domination was followed by Saracen, Norman, Angevin and Aragonese control. During the Napoleonic Wars, the British considered the possibility of taking over Linosa (together with Pantelleria and Lampedusa) so as to be able to supply Malta, but a Royal Commission stated in an 1812 report that there would be considerable difficulties in this venture.

The island remained deserted until 1843 when Ferdinand II of the Two Sicilies ordered Knight Bernardo Maria Sanvinsente, captain of frigate, to colonize the island. The first thirty colonists (artisans from Ustica, Agrigento and Pantelleria) with the addition of a mayor, a priest and a doctor, landed on 25 April 1845.

During World War II, a small Italian garrison surrendered to a British force from HMS Nubian on the morning of 13 June 1943.

Few were interested in the island during the Kingdom of Italy and only in the 1970s did the island begin to change, with technological innovations and the development of tourism. The first telephone exchange was installed in 1963, the first power station in 1967, and a new school with a nursery in 1968. In 1983 the building of a desalinization plant provided a constant supply of potable water.

Economy
Linosa's population subsists on agriculture and tourism.

See also
 List of islands of Italy
Italy–Tunisia Delimitation Agreement
List of volcanoes in Italy
Terraferma (film)

References

External links

Island statistics

Volcanoes of Italy
Pelagie Islands
Frazioni of the Province of Agrigento
Lampedusa e Linosa